Abissa is a cultural concept embracing the music, dance, and spiritual life of the Nzema  people in the town of Grand-Bassam, Côte d'Ivoire, West Africa. The best-known expression of Abissa is a festival celebrated in the last week of October. It is a time of forgiveness and rebirth marked by a week-long celebration.

References

External links
 Abissa Festivale

Ivorian culture
Ivorian music
October events
Sud-Comoé